The 2021 Malaysia Cup (Malay: Piala Malaysia 2021) was the 95th edition of Malaysia Cup tournament organised by the Football Association of Malaysia (FAM) and the Malaysian Football League (MFL).

The defending champions were Johor Darul Ta'zim, who won it in the 2019 edition, as the 2020 edition was cancelled midway during the tournament due to the COVID-19 pandemic in Malaysia. In the final, they lost 2–0 to Kuala Lumpur City, who won their fourth title. As winners, Kuala Lumpur City qualified for the 2022 AFC Cup.

Format 
In the competition, the top eleven teams from the 2021 Malaysia Super League were joined by the top five teams from the 2021 Malaysia Premier League. The competition will begin with a group stage where only the 2 highest placing teams in each group would qualify to the knockout stage.

Schedule and draw dates
The draw for the 2021 Malaysia Cup was held on 15 September 2021.

Seeding 
They were divided to their pots by their placements from the 2021 Malaysia Super League to 2021 Malaysia Premier League, so pot 1 includes the top 4 teams from the Super League, pot 2 with those place 5th to 8th, pot 3 with those placed 9th to 11th together with the 1st placed team from the Premier League, and pot 4 with those placed 2 to 5.

Group stage

Group A

Group B

Group C

Group D

Knockout stage

In the knockout phase, teams played against each other over two legs on a home-and-away basis, except for the final which was played as a single-leg game. The mechanism of the draws for each round was as follows:
In the draw for the quarter-final, the fourth group winners were seeded, and the fourth group runners-up were unseeded. The seeded teams were drawn against the unseeded teams, with the seeded teams hosting the second leg. Teams from the same group or the same association could not be drawn against each other.
In the draws for the quarter-finals onwards, there were no seedings, and teams from the same group or the same association could be drawn against each other.

Bracket

Quarter-finals

The first legs were played on 14 November, and the second legs on 18 November 2021.

Semi-finals
The first legs were played on 22 November, and the second legs on 26 November 2021.

Final 

The final was played at the Bukit Jalil National Stadium in Kuala Lumpur on 30 November 2021.

Statistics

Goalscorers 
Players sorted first by goals, then by name.

Hat-tricks 

Notes:
(H) – Home team
(A) – Away team

Winners

See also 
2021 Piala Sumbangsih
2021 Malaysia Super League
2021 Malaysia Premier League

References 

2021 in Malaysian football
Malaysia Cup seasons
Malaysia Cup